Supercharged is the eighth album by the American soul/R&B group Tavares. It was produced by David Foster, Benjamin Wright and Bobby Colomby, and released in 1980 on Capitol Records. Supercharged is similar in style to the group's previous album Madam Butterfly, although not as highly regarded at its predecessor.  Lead single "Bad Times" reached the R&B top 10 and #47 on the pop chart, the group's first showing on that chart since "More Than a Woman" in 1977.  Supercharged made #20 on the R&B chart and #75 on the pop chart.

Critical reception
AllMusic wrote that "this respectable, if uneven, effort contains a few gems, including the sociopolitical 'Bad Times' (a number ten R&B hit) and the Stylistics-influenced 'I Just Can't Go on Living Without You'."

Track listing 
 "Bad Times" (Gerard McMahon) – 7:15
 "We Both Tried" (David Foster, Bill Champlin) – 4:15
 "Can't Get Enough" (Benjamin Wright, Kathy Wakefield, Tony Coleman) – 3:49
 "Why Can't We Fall In Love" (Carole Bayer Sager, David Foster, Deniece Williams) – 4:09
 "I Can't Go On Living Without You" (Wright) – 5:13
 "I Don't Want You Anymore" (Foster, Champlin) – 4:03
 "Paradise" (Teddy Randazzo) – 4:58
 "Got to Have Your Love" (Angelo Richards, Patrick Henderson) – 3:46

Singles 
 "Bad Times" (US Pop #47, US R&B #10)
 "I Can't Go On Living Without You" (US R&B #42)

References

Tavares (group) albums
1980 albums
Albums produced by David Foster
albums produced by Bobby Colomby
Capitol Records albums